Colasposoma unicostatum is a species of leaf beetle endemic to Socotra. It was described by Stefano Zoia in 2012. The species name refers to the single longitudinal carina present on each elytron.

References

unicostatum
Beetles of Asia
Endemic fauna of Socotra
Insects of the Arabian Peninsula
Beetles described in 2012